Zdeněk Valnoha (born 8 May 1973) is a Czech football midfielder. He made over 200 appearances in the Gambrinus liga. He also played in the top leagues in Slovakia and Cyprus. Valnoha played international football at under-21 level for Czech Republic U21.

References

External links
 
 Profile at Brno club website

1973 births
Living people
Footballers from Brno
Czech footballers
Czech Republic under-21 international footballers
Czech First League players
Cypriot First Division players
FC Zbrojovka Brno players
1. FK Příbram players
FK Drnovice players
1. SC Znojmo players
Slovak Super Liga players
MFK Ružomberok players
Olympiakos Nicosia players
ENTHOI Lakatamia FC players
Atromitos Yeroskipou players
Czech expatriate footballers
Expatriate footballers in Cyprus
Expatriate footballers in Slovakia

Association football midfielders